Tobia Senoner (28 March 1913 – 27 February 1980) was an Italian cross-country skier. He competed in the men's 50 kilometre event at the 1936 Winter Olympics.

References

1913 births
1980 deaths
Italian male cross-country skiers
Olympic cross-country skiers of Italy
Cross-country skiers at the 1936 Winter Olympics
Place of birth missing